Boudiera is a genus of fungi within the Pezizaceae family. It forms a clade with the genera Sarcosphaera and Iodophanus, and all three taxa are a sister group to Ascobolus and Saccobolus, both in the family Ascobolaceae.

References

External links
Index Fungorum

Pezizaceae
Pezizales genera
Taxa named by Mordecai Cubitt Cooke